Alexandra Maksimova (born June 19, 1989) is a Belarusian ice dancer. She competed with Egor Maistrov. They teamed up in 2005 and were the 2006 Belarusian national silver medalists. Their partnership ended following the 2006/2007 season.

Competitive highlights
(with Maistrov)

External links
 

Belarusian female ice dancers
Living people
1989 births